International Day of Women Judges holds every March 10 to recognize the contributions of women judges worldwide and is part of global effort to ensuring gender equality and to address gender-related judicial integrity issues. It aims to incorporate women’s representation issues into judicial systems.

Background 
In April 26 2021, the United Nations General Assembly declared the day by a resolution adopted by consensus.  The day was observed globally for the first time on March 10, 2022.

References 

Civil awareness days
Feminist events
Recurring events established in 2021
Women judges
March observances